Florida is a state in the South Atlantic region of the United States. Since its admission to the Union in March 1845, it has participated in 43 United States presidential elections. Florida participated in the presidential election for the first time in 1848. In this election, the Whig Party won Florida's three electoral votes with 57.20% of the vote, the only time the Whig Party won in Florida. In the realigning 1860 election, Florida was one of the ten slave states that did not provide ballot access to the Republican nominee, Abraham Lincoln. And in the 1860 presidential election, John C. Breckinridge emerged victorious in Florida, winning 62.23% of the vote. Shortly after this election, Florida seceded from the Union and became a part of the Confederacy. Due to the secession, Florida did not participate in the 1864 presidential election. With the end of the Civil War, Florida rejoined the Union and participated the 1868 presidential election. The 1868 election was the sole presidential contest in Florida not decided by popular vote, but instead by the state legislature. Florida voted for the Republican nominee in all three presidential elections during the Reconstruction era.

Shortly after the Reconstruction era, white Democrats regained control of Florida legislature. In 1885, they created a new constitution, followed by statutes through 1889 that disfranchised most blacks and many poor whites. From the end of the Reconstruction era until the 1952 presidential election, the Republican Party only won Florida once, in the 1928 presidential election. The party's victory in that election was mainly due to its Democratic opponent Al Smith, who was a Catholic and opposed to Prohibition, which caused many members of the Southern Baptist Convention to switch to the Republican Party.

From 1948 to 1952, the emergence of the Pinellas Republican Party began to shift Florida towards the Republican Party. Since the presidential election in 1952, the Democrats have won Florida in only five presidential elections: 1964, 1976, 1996, 2008, and 2012. In the 2000 presidential election, Bush led Gore by less than 2,000 votes on election day, but as the recount proceeded, the gap between the two sides continued to narrow. The Bush campaign team filed a lawsuit against Gore in the U.S. Supreme Court, arguing that the recounting of votes in certain counties violated the law. The case became known as Bush v. Gore. The Supreme Court announced the halt of vote recounting on December 12. George W. Bush eventually won Florida's electoral votes by a margin of only 537 votes out of almost six million cast (0.009%) and, as a result, became the president-elect.

Florida was long a swing state, and furthermore, it has been seen as a bellwether in presidential elections since 1928 (only missed in 1960, 1992 and 2020). However, with the Republican Party's performance in Florida far exceeding its national average in the 2022 midterm elections, many analysts believe that the state has transitioned from being a Republican-leaning swing state into a reliable red state.

Presidential elections

1848 to 1856

1860 and 1864
The election of 1860 was a complex realigning election in which the breakdown of the previous two-party alignment culminated in four parties each competing for influence in different parts of the country. The result of the election, with the victory of an ardent opponent of slavery, spurred the secession of eleven states and brought about the American Civil War.

1868 to present

Graph

See also
 Elections in Florida
 List of United States presidential election results by state

Notes

References

Works cited